In artificial intelligence and computer programming, state space planning is a process used in designing programs to search for data or solutions to problems.  In a computer algorithm that searches a data structure for a piece of data, for example a program that looks up a word in a computer dictionary, the state space is a collective term for all the data to be searched.  Similarly, artificial intelligence programs often employ a process of searching through a finite universe of possible procedures for reaching a goal, to find a procedure or the best procedure to achieve the goal.  The universe of possible solutions to be searched is called the state space.  State space planning is the process of deciding which parts of the state space the program will search, and in what order.

Definition
The simplest classical planning (see Automated Planning) algorithms are state space search algorithms. These
are search algorithms in which the search space is a subset of the state space: Each
node corresponds to a state of the world, each arc corresponds to a state transition,
and the current plan corresponds to the current path in the search space.
Forward Search and Backward Search are two of main samples of state space planning.

Forward search
Forward search is an algorithm that searches forward from the
initial state of the world to try to find a state that satisfies the goal formula.

Forward-search(O, s0, g)
  s = s0
  P = the empty plan
  loop
      if s satisfies g then return P
      applicable = {a | a is a ground instance of an operator in O,and precond(a) is true in s}
      if applicable = ∅ then return failure 
      nondeterministically choose an action a from applicable
      s = γ(s, a)
      P = P.a

Backward search
Backward-search is an algorithm that begins with goal state and back track to its initial state. This method is sometimes called "back propagation."

Backward-search(O, s0, g)
  s = s0
  P = the empty plan
  loop
      if s satisfies g then return P
      relevant = {a | a is a ground instance of an operator in O that is relevant for g}
      if relevant = ∅ then return failure 
      nondeterministically choose an action a from relevant
      P = a.P  
      s = γ−1(s, a)

See also 
 State space
 State space search

References